The Mizoram Legislative Assembly is the unicameral state legislature of Mizoram in India. The seat of the Legislative Assembly is at Aizawl, the capital of the state. The Legislative Assembly is composed of 40 members, who are directly elected from single-seat constituencies. The current legislature was elected in 2018, and its term will last until 2023.

List of assemblies

List of speakers

Members of Legislative Assembly

See also
State governments of India
Government of Mizoram

References

External links
 

 
State legislatures of India
Unicameral legislatures